Pronoides is a genus of Asian orb-weaver spiders first described by E. Schenkel in 1936.

Species
 it contains six species:
Pronoides applanatus Mi & Peng, 2013 – China
Pronoides brunneus Schenkel, 1936 (type) – Russia (Far East), China, Korea, Japan
Pronoides fusinus Mi & Peng, 2013 – China
Pronoides guoi Mi & Peng, 2013 – China
Pronoides sutaiensis Zhang, Zhang & Zhu, 2010 – China
Pronoides trapezius Mi & Peng, 2013 – China

References

Araneidae
Araneomorphae genera
Spiders of Asia